The 2014 Texas State Bobcats football team represented Texas State University in the 2014 NCAA Division I FBS football season. The Bobcats were led by head coach Dennis Franchione, in his fourth year, and played their home games at Bobcat Stadium. They were a member of the Sun Belt Conference. They finished the season 7–5, 5–3 in Sun Belt play to finish in a three way tie for fourth place. Although eligible, they were not selected to participate in a bowl game; the Bobcats were the only eligible 7–5 FBS team not to receive a bowl bid.

Schedule

Schedule Source:

Game summaries

Arkansas–Pine Bluff

Navy

Illinois

Tulsa

Idaho

Louisiana–Lafayette

Louisiana–Monroe

New Mexico State

Georgia Southern

South Alabama

Arkansas State

Georgia State

References

Texas State
Texas State Bobcats football seasons
Texas State Bobcats football